Coltness High School is a secondary school located in Coltness, the largest suburb of Wishaw, North Lanarkshire, Scotland. The school opened in 1966, and as of May 2015 had a roll of 780 pupils. The school serves the catchment area of Coltness and Cambusnethan, as well as settlements outside of Wishaw such as Cleland.

From 2010 the school underwent a series of renovation works to modernise its aging facilities and reduce the likelihood of closure.

Notable alumni
 Andrew Barrowman, footballer
 Derek Holmes, footballer
 Stewart Kerr, footballer
 Scott Leitch, footballer and manager
 Lewis Macleod, footballer
 David McEwan, footballer
 Paul Quinn, footballer
 Catherine Stihler, Scottish MEP and Rector of the University of St Andrews
 David Turnbull, footballer
 Andrew Wilson, ex-MSP
Harry Young, Love Island 2021

References

External links
 Coltness High School
 Coltness High School on Education Scotland

Educational institutions established in 1966
Secondary schools in North Lanarkshire
Wishaw
1966 establishments in Scotland